× Aranda, abbreviated in trade journals Aranda, is an intergeneric hybrid between the orchid genera Arachnis and Vanda (Arach x V).

References

Aeridinae
Orchid nothogenera